"Keep Our Fire Burning" is a single by the Finnish rock band Hanoi Rocks. The single was only released in Finland.

Keep Our Fire Burning is an old Hanoi Rocks-song from 1983, that was never recorded on a release or played live. Guitarist Andy McCoy had originally written the song for a popular Japanese pop-artist Yasuaki Honda, and for his album Angel Of Glass. The song featured lyrics dealing with love, and are different from on this release. The next time the song was released by Pelle Miljoona in 1996 under the name "Kaipaan sua" ("I miss you" in English), on his  Hyvät pahat ja hitit 2-compilation, again with different lyrics. Pelle Miljoona recorded the song again a year later with a new band. This version also featured Andy McCoy on guitar.

When McCoy and Monroe reformed Hanoi Rocks in the early 2000s, Monroe found the song in a pile of old demo-tapes, and wanted the reborn Hanoi Rocks to record it. Monroe and McCoy wrote new lyrics to the song, and McCoy changed the intro of the song a little.

The B-side of the single, "Heaven Is Gonna Be Empty", is a cover of the Pearl Harbour song. Neither of the songs were featured on the band's album Another Hostile Takeover, but were released to promote the album.

Track listing

"Keep Our Fire Burning" - 3:49(McCoy/Monroe)
"Heaven Is Gonna Be Empty" - 2:47(Pearl Harbour)

Personnel
Michael Monroe - Lead vocals, saxophone, guitar, percussion
Andy McCoy - Lead guitar, backing vocals
Stevie Klasson - Rhythm guitar
Timpa Laine - Bass
Lacu - Drums
Pate Kivinen - Piano

Chart positions

Singles

References

Hanoi Rocks songs
2004 songs
Songs written by Andy McCoy
Songs written by Michael Monroe